

Coaching staff

Players

Squad information

Players and squad numbers last updated on 30 January 2019.Note: Flags indicate national team as has been defined under FIFA eligibility rules. Players may hold more than one non-FIFA nationality.

Competitions

Overview

Torneo Invierno

League table

Results summary

Matches

Repechaje

Liguilla

Quarter-finals

Semi-finals

Torneo Verano

League table

Results summary

Statistics

Goals

Hat-tricks

Clean sheets

References

Toros Neza seasons
1996–97 Mexican Primera División season
1996–97 in Mexican football